Chuncheon National Museum is a national museum in Chuncheon, South Korea. It opened on October 30, 2002.

See also
List of museums in South Korea
National museum

References

External links
 Chuncheon National Museum Official Site

Chuncheon
National museums of South Korea
Museums in Gangwon Province, South Korea
Museums established in 2002
2002 establishments in South Korea